is a Japanese former professional racing cyclist.

Career
Suzuki was born in Kanagawa Prefecture. He won the national championship in 2002, the Asian championship in 2003 and 2004, and represented Japan in the 2004 Summer Olympics. In 2012 he rode for a new team, Cannondale Spacepointzero, where he served as both team captain and a coach.

Major results

2001
 1st Stage 7 Tour de Korea
 1st Stage 6 Tour de Hokkaido
 3rd Tour de Okinawa
2002
 1st  Road race, National Road Championships
 1st Stage 3 Tour de Hokkaido
 4th Tour de Okinawa
 7th Overall Tour of Japan
1st Stage 6
2003
 1st Road race, Asian Cycling Championships
 1st Stage 7 Vuelta a las Americas
2004
 1st Road race, Asian Cycling Championships
 2nd Road race, National Road Championships
 6th Overall Tour of Japan
1st Stage 5
2005
 9th Japan Cup
2006
 1st Points classification Tour of Japan
 2nd Overall Tour de Hokkaido
 3rd Road race, National Road Championships
2008
 1st Stage 1 Tour de Korea
 10th Overall Tour de Hokkaido
2009
 1st Stage 4 Tour de Taiwan
 2nd Overall Tour de Kumano
 2nd Overall Tour de Hokkaido
1st Stage 6
 4th Kumamoto International Road Race
 5th Overall Tour de Okinawa
 9th Japan Cup
2010
 1st Stage 4 Tour of Japan
 2nd Road race, National Road Championships
 3rd Kumamoto International Road Race
 5th Japan Cup
2011
 9th Ronde van Noord-Holland
2012
 9th Overall Tour de Kumano
2014
 4th Tour de Okinawa
 9th Overall Tour de Hokkaido

References

External links

1974 births
Living people
Japanese male cyclists
People from Kanagawa Prefecture
Olympic cyclists of Japan
Cyclists at the 2004 Summer Olympics
Cyclists at the 2002 Asian Games
Cyclists at the 2010 Asian Games
Asian Games competitors for Japan